Operation Haylift is a  1950 American aviation film by William Berke starring Bill Williams, Ann Rutherford, and Tom Brown. The film - a fictionalized account of a true story - documents the United States Air Force mission in 1948–49 to save thousands of cattle caught in the snowdrifts of a sudden winter storm in northern Nevada. "Operation Haylift" involved scores of cargo aircraft delivering hay to the stranded animals.

Plot
With their 10-year-old son Roy (Tommy Ivo), Bill (Bill Williams) and Clara Masters (Ann Rutherford) live in a ranch near Ely, Nevada. Bill's brother Tom (Tom Brown), recently returned from serving as a pilot in the United States Air Force, is home to work on the ranch. When Bill and Tom capture rustlers, they earn a $5,000 reward from George Swallow (Joe Sawyer) of the Stockman's Association. Bill wants to use the money to buy more ranch land but he senses Tom does not have his heart in working at the ranch. When Bill sends for Tom's girlfriend Pat Rogers (Jane Nigh), they marry and leave for their honeymoon in Tahoe.

On the way, the married couple meet Tom's old service buddy Max Maxwell (Richard Travis) and his wife. Max has rejoined the Air Force and is about based on true story, He and his dog had to leave for Germany to take part in the Berlin Airlift. Tom also rejoins and leaves with Pat for Germany. When his tour finishes in 1948, he's back home, where the United States is experiencing first a drought, then a massive series of 18 blizzards in 27 days, which cripples Nevada.

A state of emergency is declared and the U.S. Army and National Guard units from Nevada and neighboring states are called out. In the winter, many sheep and cattle experience freezing temperatures and die of starvation. George Swallow calls ranchers proposing to seek the Air Force's help in dropping hay to the stranded animals. Bill is skeptical that the scheme will work. A fleet of 18 Fairchild C-82 Packets arrive at Fallon Airport, with Tom scheduled to fly the first mission.

The first flight is a great success and, while President Harry S. Truman requests emergency funds for the ranchers, the 62nd Troop Carrier Group continues its haylift operation. When Bill gets stuck in a snowdrift, he has to ride on horseback into Ely for help. Tom flies a mission to drop hay to Bill's animals and eventually, with the successful conclusion of Operation Haylift, thousands of tons of hay dropped over an area of 85,000 square miles saved a million head of cattle and two million sheep.

Cast

 Bill Williams as Bill Masters
 Ann Rutherford as Clara Masters
 Tom Brown as Tom Masters
 Jane Nigh as Pat Rogers
 Joe Sawyer as George Swallow
 Richard Travis as Max Maxwell
 Raymond Hatton as Sandy Cameron
 James Conlin as Ed North
 Tommy Ivo as Roy Masters
 M'Liss McClure as Mary

Production
Production of Operation Haylift took place in Ely, the center of the actual operation. The opening credits include the following written prologue: "This production was photographed entirely in Ely, Nevada, and was made possible through the cooperation of the Department of Defense, U.S. Air Force and the Department of Agriculture." In the months prior to production, producer Joe Sawyer and cameraman Benjamin Kline made six trips to Ely to arrange filming locations.

Filming began on January 11, 1950, and was expected to last at least eight days.

Primary filming locations included Ely's main street, the office of United Stockmen, various ranches, and Ely Airport. Ely's Hotel Nevada and Gambling Hall was also used as a filming location, and also served as headquarters for the cast and crew. For filming, the United States Air Force provided C-82s from Wright-Patterson Air Force Base in Ohio. More than 200 local residents appeared in the film, primarily in crowd scenes.

The film premiere took place in Ely on April 10, 1950. George N. Swallow, who was involved in the actual operation and served as a technical advisor for the film, was also largely responsible for getting the film to shoot in Ely. Swallow was also primarily responsible for the film's premiere taking place in Ely.

Reception
Operation Haylift was a modest B movie whose "... most interesting moments come during sequences of the Flying Boxcars, lent by the Air Force for the film." Aviation film historians Jack Hardwick and Ed Schnepf cynically dismissed Operation Haylift as "... good if you like to watch C-82s dropping hay."

References

Notes

Citations

Bibliography

 Hardwick, Jack and Ed Schnepf. "A Viewer's Guide to Aviation Movies". The Making of the Great Aviation Films, General Aviation Series, Volume 2, 1989.
 Pendo, Stephen. Aviation in the Cinema. Lanham, Maryland: Scarecrow Press, 1985. .

External links
 
  
 

1950 films
1950s adventure drama films
Films set in Nevada
American aviation films
American adventure drama films
Films directed by William A. Berke
Lippert Pictures films
American black-and-white films
1950s English-language films
1950s American films